Ranjani is a Carnatic raga, which is also sometimes written as Ranjini.  This raga is a janya of the 59th Melakarta raga Dharmavati.

It is an asymmetric pentatonic scale, which is pleasing and has been more popular in last 50 years. It figures in ragamalikas, slokams, vrittams and light popular songs, as it is a pleasing scale.

Structure and Lakshana 

This ragam is an asymmetric scale and is classified as an audava-audava ragam (five notes in the ascending and descending scale).

: 
: 

The notes in this scale are chathushruthi rishabham, sadharana gandharam, prati madhyamam, chathusruthi dhaivatam in arohana and additional kakli nishadham in avarohanam, in place of sadharna rishabham (see pictures). From Dharmavati scale (59th melakarta), the panchamam is removed in this scale and the rest are used in asymmetrical manner which gives the pleasing aspect to this ragam.

S R2 G2 S, S N3. D2. S - is a catch phrase that is unique to ragam Ranjani (where N3. and D2. denotes lower octave).

Select compositions 
Durmargachara in Rupakam composed by Thyagaraja
Kaadiruvenu Naanu By Ambujam Krishna in Kannada
Ranjani Niranjani in Rupakam Adi by G. N. Balasubramaniam
Amboruha Padhame Ranjani Raga Varnam by G. N. Balasubramaniam
KenjugirEn Amma in Adi Talam.

Film songs

Tamil

Notes

References

See also 
There are many ragams that end with Ranjani.
 Mararanjani (melakarta)
 Manoranjani
 Shree ranjani
 Shivaranjani
 List of Janya Ragas

Janya ragas